Princeton Theological Seminary (PTSem), officially The Theological Seminary of the Presbyterian Church, is a private school of theology in Princeton, New Jersey. Founded in 1812 under the auspices of Archibald Alexander, the General Assembly of the Presbyterian Church (USA), and the College of New Jersey (now Princeton University), it is the second-oldest seminary in the United States. It is also the largest of ten seminaries associated with the Presbyterian Church.

Princeton Seminary has long been influential in theological studies, with many leading biblical scholars, theologians, and clergy among its faculty and alumni. In addition, it operates one of the largest theological libraries in the world and maintains a number of special collections, including the Karl Barth Research Collection in the Center for Barth Studies. The seminary also manages an endowment of $1.13 billion, making it the third-wealthiest institution of higher learning in the state of New Jersey—after Princeton University and Rutgers University.

In the 1980s, Princeton Seminary enrolled about 900 students but today, the seminary enrolls approximately 333 students. While around 26 percent of them are candidates for ministry specifically in the Presbyterian Church, the majority are completing such candidature in other denominations, pursuing careers in academia across a number of different disciplines, or receiving training for other, non-theological fields altogether.

Seminarians hold academic reciprocity with Princeton University as well as the Westminster Choir College of Rider University, New Brunswick Theological Seminary, Jewish Theological Seminary, and the School of Social Work at Rutgers University. The institution also has an ongoing relationship with the Center of Theological Inquiry.

History

The plan to establish a theological seminary in Princeton was in the interests of advancing and extending the theological curriculum. The educational intention was to go beyond the liberal arts course by setting up a postgraduate, professional school in theology. The plan met with enthusiastic approval on the part of authorities at the College of New Jersey, later to become Princeton University, for they were coming to see that specialized training in theology required more attention than they could give. The General Assembly of the Presbyterian Church established the Theological Seminary at Princeton, New Jersey, in 1812, with the support of the directors of the nearby College of New Jersey (now Princeton University), as the second graduate theological school in the United States. The seminary remains an institution of the Presbyterian Church (USA), being the largest of the ten theological seminaries affiliated with the 1.2-million-member denomination.

In 1812, the seminary boasted three students and Archibald Alexander as its first professor. By 1815 the number of students had gradually increased and work began on a building: Alexander Hall was designed by John McComb Jr., a New York architect, and opened in 1817. The original cupola was added in 1827, but it burned in 1913 and was replaced in 1926. The building was simply called "Seminary" until 1893, when it was officially named Alexander Hall. Since its founding, Princeton Seminary has graduated approximately 14,000 men and women who have served the church in many capacities, from pastoral ministry and pastoral care to missionary work, Christian education and leadership in the academy and business.

The seminary was made famous during the 19th and early 20th centuries for its defense of Calvinistic Presbyterianism, a tradition that became known as Princeton Theology and greatly influenced Evangelicalism during the period. Some of the institution's figures active in this movement included Charles Hodge, B.B. Warfield, J. Gresham Machen, and Geerhardus Vos.

Liberalism and split
In response to the increasing influence of theological liberalism in the 1920s and the Fundamentalist–Modernist Controversy at the institution, several theologians left to form the Westminster Theological Seminary under the leadership of J. Gresham Machen.
The college was later the center of the Fundamentalist–Modernist Controversy of the 1920s and 1930s. In 1929, the seminary was reorganized along modernist lines, and in response, Machen, along with three of his colleagues: Oswald T. Allis, Robert Dick Wilson and Cornelius Van Til, resigned, with Machen, Allis and Wilson founding Westminster Theological Seminary in Glenside, Pennsylvania. In 1958, Princeton became a seminary of the United Presbyterian Church in the U.S.A., following a merger between the Presbyterian Church in the U.S.A. and the United Presbyterian Church of North America, and in 1983, it would become a seminary of the Presbyterian Church (U.S.A.) after the merger between the UPCUSA and the Presbyterian Church in the U.S.

Ties to slavery
In 2019, the seminary announced that it would spend $27 million on "scholarships and other initiatives to address its historical ties to slavery".

2022 President 
Rev. Jonathan Lee Walton was announced to become the next president of Princeton Theological Seminary. Rev. Jonathan Lee Walton will begin his tenure starting January 1, 2023. The appointing of Rev. Jonathan Lee Walton as the next president marks a historical event as he will serve as the first Black president since the establishment in 1812.

Academics
Princeton Theological Seminary has been accredited by the Commission on Accrediting of the Association of Theological Schools (ATS) since 1938 and by the Middle States Commission on Higher Education since 1968.

Degree programs
 Master of Divinity (M.Div.)
 Masters of Arts (MA)
 Master of Arts in Theological Studies (MATS)
 Master of Theology (Th.M.)
 Doctor of Ministry (D.Min.), offered from 1975 to 2005, having been replaced with Ph.D. in Practical Theology
 Doctor of Philosophy (Ph.D.), although the Doctor of Theology was previously awarded
 Dual M.Div./MA in Christian Education with foci in Youth & Young Adults, Teaching Ministry, or Spiritual Development
Dual M.Div./MSW in partnership with Rutgers School of Social Work

Libraries
The Wright Library is a destination for visiting scholars from around the world. The current library building was completed in 2013 and was renamed on October 13, 2021 after Theodore S. Wright, the first African American to graduate from Princeton Theological Seminary. The library has over 1,252,503 bound volumes, pamphlets, and microfilms. It currently receives about 2,100 journals, annual reports of church bodies and learned societies, bulletins, transactions, and periodically issued indices, abstracts, and bibliographies. The Libraries are:
 Princeton Theological Seminary Library ("The Wright Library") was opened in 2013 and holds the bulk of the seminary's collection. The library is also home to the Center for Barth Studies, the Reigner Reading Room, and special collections including the Abraham Kuyper collection of Dutch Reformed Protestantism and personal libraries of theologians like Ashbel Green, William Buell Sprague, Joseph Addison Alexander, Alexander Balloch Grosart, William Henry Green, Samuel Miller, and B. B. Warfield.
 Speer Library, opened in 1957 and named in honor of the renowned missionary statesman Robert E. Speer. It was closed in late 2010 and was replaced by the new library.
 Henry Luce III Library, dedicated in 1994 and named in honor of a distinguished trustee, Henry W. Luce, has 350,000 volumes and 250 readers. This library merged with Wright Library in 2013.

Rankings
Given its status as an autonomous postgraduate institution, Princeton Seminary does not appear in most global or national rankings for universities and colleges. As a graduate school, however, it does see such ranking on occasion. In 2020, it was ranked #53 nationwide – tied with University of Iowa and University of Florida – for the field of history by the U.S. News & World Report. It was also rated at A+ by the American rankings and review company Niche in 2020. The journal First Things, an organ of the Institute on Religion and Public Life in New York, ranked Princeton Seminary fifth among American graduate programs in theology, in 2012.

Student life
According to The Princeton Review, as of 2020 the gender breakdown of the student body falls into 60% identifying as male and 40% as female, with a total enrollment of 530.

Seminary Chapel

Built in 1834, Princeton Seminary's chapel was named to honor Samuel Miller, the second professor at the seminary. It was designed in the Greek Revival style by Charles Steadman, who also designed the nearby Nassau Presbyterian Church.  Originally located beside Alexander Hall, it was moved in 1933 toward the center of the campus, its steps now leading down onto the seminary's main quad. Miller Chapel underwent a complete renovation in 2000, with the addition of the Joe R. Engle Organ.

On January 18, 2022, members of the Association of Black Seminarians physically removed the sign naming the chapel "Miller Chapel" and held a protest calling for the trustees to rename the chapel because of Samuel Miller's direct ties to slavery. On January 25, 2022, the Board of Trustees of Princeton Seminary voted to rename Miller Chapel in light of the protest. "This decision followed thoughtful deliberation by the Board of Trustees, and it is part of their commitment to the ongoing work of confession and repentance that was part of the historical audit on slavery."

Navigating the Waters
In 2011, Princeton Theological Seminary's Office of Multicultural Relations and The Kaleidoscope Institute worked together to initiate an effort known as "Navigating the Waters," a program designed to promote cultural proficiency and diversity competency in faculty, staff, and students.

Research

Center for Barth Studies

The Center for Barth Studies was established at Princeton Seminary in 1997 and is administered by a board of seminary faculty. The Center sponsors conferences, research opportunities, discussion groups, and publications that seek to advance understanding of the theology of Karl Barth (1886–1968), the German Swiss professor and pastor widely regarded as the greatest theologian of the 20th century. The Karl Barth Research Collection, part of Special Collections in the Princeton Theological Seminary Libraries, supports the scholarly activities of the Center for Barth Studies. The Karl Barth Research Collection is acquiring an exhaustive collection of writings by and about Karl Barth. Although many volumes are still needed, the Research Collection has already acquired Barth's most important works in German and English, several first editions, and an original hand-written manuscript by Karl Barth.

Abraham Kuyper Center for Public Theology
The heart of the Abraham Kuyper Center for Public Theology is the Abraham Kuyper Collection of Dutch Reformed Protestantism in the library's Special Collections, which focuses on the theology and history of Dutch Reformed Protestantism since the nineteenth century and features a sizable assemblage of primary and secondary sources by and about Abraham Kuyper. The center maintains in partnership with the Vrije Universiteit Amsterdam an online database of secondary literature about Abraham Kuyper.

The center has also established an annual event organized to award the Abraham Kuyper Prize for Excellence in Reformed Theology and Public Life, during which the recipient delivers an address. The Abraham Kuyper Consultation, a series of further lectures, takes place on the following day.

In 2017, there was a controversy surrounding the plan to award the Kuyper Prize to Tim Keller, then Pastor of Redeemer Presbyterian Church in New York City. A group of students and faculty protested that Keller should not receive the award due to his non-affirming views regarding LGBTQ and women clergy. President Barnes initially defended awarding Keller the prize before changing his position. Keller withdrew himself from consideration for the prize and still delivered his lecture. While drawing support from some quarters, the decision to not award Keller the prize also drew criticism in the Wall Street Journal and Washington Post.

Center of Theological Inquiry
In 1978, Princeton Theological Seminary's Board of Trustees established the Center of Theological Inquiry (CTI''') as an independent, ecumenical institution for advanced theological research, "to inquire into the relationship between theological disciplines, [and of these with] ... both human and natural sciences, to inquire into the relationship between diverse religious traditions ..., to inquire into the present state of religious consciousness in the modern world, and to examine such other facets of religion in the modern world as may be appropriate ..." Today, the center has its own board, funding, mission and staff, yet maintains close relations with Princeton Theological Seminary. The present director is William Storrar and the director of research is Robin Lovin.

JournalsTheology Today is a peer-reviewed, quarterly journal of Christian theology founded in 1944.Koinonia Journal is published annually by doctoral students at Princeton Theological Seminary. The publication and its annual forum promote written and face-to-face interdisciplinary discussion about issues in theology and the study of religion. It is distributed to well over 100 libraries worldwide.Princeton Theological Review is a student-run, annual and online journal that exists to serve students within the Princeton Theological Seminary body as well as the wider theological community. It is distributed to well over 100 libraries worldwide.

Seminary Lectureships

 Abraham Kuyper Lecture and Prize, held in April. In 2017, Princeton Theological Seminary reversed its decision to award the Kuyper Prize to Tim Keller after a group of alumni voiced their objection to the choice due to Keller belonging to a denomination (Presbyterian Church in America) that ordain neither women nor practicing homosexuals. However, the seminary did allow Keller to deliver the Kuyper Lecture without receiving the Kuyper Prize.
 The Alexander Thompson Lecture, held biannually in March.
 The Frederick Neumann Memorial Lecture, held biannually in November.
 Dr. Geddes W. Hanson Lecture, held biannually, fall semester.
 Dr. Martin Luther King Jr. Lecture, held in February.
 Dr. Sang Hyun Lee Lecture, held biannually, spring semester.
 The Donald Macleod/Short Hills Community Congregational Church Preaching Lectureship, held biannually, fall semester.
 Toyohiko Kagawa, Japanese Evangelist and Social Worker; Lecture held triennially spring semester.
 Students' Lectureship on Missions, held biannually, fall semester.
 The Princeton Lectures on Youth, Church, and Culture, held in April.
 The Levi P. Stone Lectures, held biannually in October. Brings an internationally distinguished scholar to the seminary each year to deliver a series of public lectures. Created in 1871 by Levi P. Stone of Orange, New Jersey, a director and also a trustee of the seminary. Previous lecturers include Samuel Colcord Bartlett (1882), Samuel H. Kellogg (1892), Abraham Kuyper (1898), Henry Collin Minton (1902), Herman Bavinck (1908), Archibald Thomas Robertson (1915), Henry E. Dosker (1918), Louis Berkhof (1921), Valentine Hepp (1930), Hendrik Kraemer (1958), Karl Menninger (1969) and Nicholas Wolterstorff (1998).
 Students' Lectureship on Missions, held in October.
 The Annie Kinkead Warfield Lectures, held biannually in March, are a series of lectures which honor the memory of Annie Kinkead Warfield, wife of Benjamin Breckinridge Warfield, distinguished professor of theology at the seminary from 1887 to 1921. Previous distinguished lecturers include Karl Barth (1962), John Howard Yoder (1980), T. F. Torrance (1981), and Colin Gunton (1993).
 Women in Church and Ministry Lecture, held in February.

Frederick Buechner Prize
Acclaimed writer and theologian Frederick Buechner has long standing ties to Princeton Theological Seminary and the seminary has honored him with the creation of the Buechner Prize for Writing.  Princeton sponsored and hosted the Buechner Writing Workshop in June 2015.  Also, Princeton Theological Seminary has given copies of Buechner's Telling the Truth to students as part of their graduation.

People

Principals and Presidents of Princeton Theological Seminary

Prior to the creation of the office of President in 1902, the seminary was governed by the principal.

The Principals
 Archibald Alexander (1812–1850)
 Charles Hodge (1851–1878)
 Archibald Alexander Hodge (1878–1886)
 B. B. Warfield (1887–1902)

The Presidents
 Francis Landey Patton (1902–1913)
 J. Ross Stevenson (1914–1936)
 John A. Mackay (1936–1959)
 James I. McCord (1959–1983)
 Thomas W. Gillespie (1983–2004)
 Iain R. Torrance (2004–2012)
 M. Craig Barnes (2013–2023)
 Jonathan L. Walton (2023-)

Notable faculty (past and present)

Diogenes Allen
Dale C. Allison
Bernhard Anderson
William Park Armstrong
Emil Brunner
Donald Eric Capps
James H. Charlesworth
Ellen Charry
F. W. Dobbs-Allsopp
Jane Dempsey Douglass
Freda Gardner
L. Gordon Graham
George Hendry
John Hick
Archibald Alexander Hodge
Charles Hodge
Elmer G. Homrighausen
George Hunsinger
James Franklin Kay
J. Gresham Machen
Bruce L. McCormack
Bruce Metzger
Patrick D. Miller
Samuel Miller
Otto Piper
Luis N. Rivera-Pagán
J. J. M. Roberts
Katharine Doob Sakenfeld
C. L. Seow
Richard Shaull
Mark S. Smith
Max L. Stackhouse
Loren Stuckenbruck
Mark Lewis Taylor
Wentzel van Huyssteen
Geerhardus Vos
B. B. Warfield
Robert Dick Wilson
Robert Jenson

Notable alumni

 James Waddel Alexander, 1823
 William Patterson Alexander, missionary to Hawaii
 Oswald T. Allis, 1905
 Rubem Alves, 1968, theologian
 Gleason Archer, 1945, evangelical theologian
 Albert Barnes, 1823
 Howard Baskerville
 Louis Berkhof, 1904
 Loraine Boettner, 1929
 Greg Boyd, 1987
 James Montgomery Boice, 1963
 William Whiting Borden
 Dave Brat, 1990, Randolph-Macon College professor and Congressional candidate in Virginia's 7th District
 Robert Jefferson Breckinridge, 1832
 G. Thompson Brown, 1950, missionary, founder of Honam Theological Academy (now Honam Theological University and Seminary).
 Hugh M. Browne, 1878, educator, principal of the Institute for Colored Youth
 Ernest T. Campbell, pastor, Riverside Church
 Eugene Cho, 1997, president of Bread for the World
 Hunter Corbett, was a pioneer American missionary to Yantai, Shandong China
 Jack Cottrell
 John Finley Crowe, 1815, founder of Hanover College
 Michael Simpson Culbertson, 1844, missionary to China
 Kathy Dawson, Associate Professor of Christian Education and Director of M.A.P.T. Program at Columbia Theological Seminary; Association of Presbyterian Church Educators' 2015 Educator of the Year.
 William Dembski, Philosopher, Mathematician, and Intelligent Design advocate, 1995
 John H. Eastwood, 1941, US Army Air Corps chaplain 464th Bombardment Group in World War II
 Sherwood Eddy, 1896, missionary to India, YMCA leader, author, educator
 Bart D. Ehrman, 1985, professor and writer
 Anna Carter Florence, 2000
 George Forell
 David Otis Fuller
 Robert A. J. Gagnon, 1993
 George Washington Gale, 1819, founder of Knox College
 Jim Garlow, pastor of Skyline Church
 James Leo Garrett Jr., 1949, theologian
 William H. Gray (Pennsylvania politician), 1970
 William Henry Green, 1846
 Francis James Grimké, 1878, African American Presbyterian pastor, co-founder of the NAACP
 Phineas Gurley, Abraham Lincoln's pastor
 Kyung-Chik Han, 1929, founder of Young Nak Presbyterian Church and winner of the Templeton Prize
 George C. Heckman, president of Hanover College 1870-79
 Charles Hodge, 1819
 Elmer George Homrighausen, 1924
 William Imbrie, missionary to Japan
 Sheldon Jackson, 1858, Presbyterian missionary in the Western United States, including Alaska
 Thornwell Jacobs, 1899, founder of Oglethorpe University
 Richard A. Jensen, 1962, theologian and author
 William Hallock Johnson, 1898, theologian and president of Lincoln University (Pennsylvania)
 Elizabeth Johnson (New Testament Scholar), J. Davison Philips Professor of New Testament at Columbia Theological Seminary
 Toyohiko Kagawa, 1916
 Margaret Grun Kibben, 1986 and 2002, received MDiv and DMin, first female chaplain of the US House of Representatives
 Guy Kratzer, 1968, Pennsylvania State Senator
 Kimberly Bracken Long, 1990, Presbyterian pastor, author, Associate Professor of Worship at Columbia Theological Seminary
 Elijah P. Lovejoy, 1834, first American martyr for freedom of the press, Presbyterian pastor and publisher of an abolitionist newspaper in Alton, Illinois, killed while defending the press from an angry mob
 Clarence Macartney, 1905
 John Gresham Machen, 1905, founder of Westminster Theological Seminary
 George Leslie Mackay, Canadian missionary to Taiwan
 John Maclean, Jr., 1818, president of Princeton University
 Allan MacRae, 1927, founder of Faith Theological Seminary and Biblical Theological Seminary
 Basil Manly, Jr., 1847
 Carl McIntire, fundamentalist, attended briefly as a student, but transferred to Westminster Theological Seminary in 1929 as a result of Fundamentalist-Modernist Controversy.
 David McKinney (publisher)
 Bruce Metzger, 1938
 Samuel H. Moffett, 1942, missionary, educator
 John Monteith, 1816, first president of the University of Michigan
 Frederick Augustus Muhlenberg (educator), 1839
 John Murray (theologian)
 John Williamson Nevin, 1826
 John Livingstone Nevius, missionary to China
 Harold Ockenga, prominent figure in 1950s "Neo-Evangelicalism", attended briefly as a student, but transferred to Westminster Theological Seminary in 1929 as a result of Fundamentalist–Modernist controversy
 Kathleen M. O'Connor
 Francis Landey Patton, 1865
 Abune Paulos, Patriarch of the Ethiopian Orthodox Tewahedo Church
 Bradley Phillips, 1849, member of the Wisconsin State Assembly
 William Swan Plumer, 1826, Presbyterian clergyman, author and educator
 James Reeb, 1953, Civil Rights martyr
 George S. Rentz, ordained in 1909; Navy chaplain during World War I and World War II
 Jana Riess, 1994
 Jay Richards
 Stanley P. Saunders, 1990
 Samuel Simon Schmucker, 1820
 Louis P. Sheldon, 1960
 Robert B. Sloan, 1973, educator
 DeForest Soaries
 William Buell Sprague, 1819
 Ned B. Stonehouse, 1927
 Loren Stuckenbruck
 Lorna Taylor
 Charles Templeton, Canadian journalist
 Timothy Tennent, 1991
 Mark L. Tidd, US Navy Admiral, 25th Chief of Chaplains
Conrad Tillard (born 1964; Master of Theology), Baptist minister, radio host, author, civil rights activist, and politician
 Henry van Dyke, 1874
 Cornelius Van Til, 1924, presuppositional apologist, taught briefly but later followed Machen to Westminster Theological Seminary in 1929.
 Geerhardus Vos, 1885
 Benjamin Breckinridge Warfield, 1876
 Neil Clark Warren
 Victor Paul Wierwille, Th.M, founding president of The Way International biblical research, teaching and fellowship ministry in New Knoxville, Ohio
 Ralph D. Winter, B.Div, founder of US Center for World Mission and William Carey International University
Theodore S. Wright, 1828.  First African-American graduate.
 John C. Young, 1828, pastor and 4th president of Centre College

References

Further reading

 David B. Calhoun, History of Princeton Seminary. In Two Volumes. Carlisle, PA: Banner of Truth, 1996.
 James Moorhead, Princeton Seminary in American Religion and Culture. Grand Rapids, MI: Eerdmans, 2012.
 Richard Osmer and Gordon Mikoski, With Piety and Learning: The History of Practical Theology at Princeton Theological Seminary 1812-2012.'' Lit Verlag, 2012.

External links

 Official website
 

 
Seminaries and theological colleges in New Jersey
Presbyterian Church (USA) seminaries
Educational institutions established in 1812
1812 establishments in New Jersey
Presbyterianism in New Jersey
Christian seminaries and theological colleges
Universities and colleges in Mercer County, New Jersey
Reparations for slavery